István Lukács, known in French as Étienne Lukacs, (14 October 1912 – 1960) was a Hungarian professional footballer who played as a striker. Lukács played in Hungary for Újpest FC and in France for FC Sète, Olympique Lillois, Saint-Étienne between 1933 and 1937, and was the Ligue 1 topscorer in the 1933–34 season, scoring 28 goals. Lukács later played in Switzerland for Lausanne Sports.

References
 Marc Barreaud, Dictionnaire des footballeurs étrangers du championnat professionnel français (1932-1997), l'Harmattan, 1997.

1912 births
1960 deaths
Association football forwards
Hungarian footballers
Hungarian expatriate footballers
Expatriate footballers in Switzerland
Expatriate footballers in France
Újpest FC players
Ligue 1 players
Ligue 2 players
AS Saint-Étienne players
FC Sète 34 players
Olympique Lillois players
FC Lausanne-Sport players